Crockford, Crockfords or Crockford's may refer to:

People
Alex Crockford, a Harry Potter cast member
Beryl Crockford (1950–2016), British rower
Douglas Crockford (born 1955), American entrepreneur and JavaScript language developer
Eric Crockford (1888–1958), British field hockey player and cricketer
Harold Crockford (1893–1983), English footballer
John Crockford, a mid 19th century English book publisher
Virginia Allen Crockford (1918–2001), American educationalist
William Crockford (1775–1844), proprietor of Crockford's club, London, England

Places
Crockford's (club), a former gentlemen's club in London, England, founded by William Crockford
Crockfords (casino), a casino in London, England

Other uses
Crockford's Clerical Directory, 1858 directory of the Anglican Communion in the United Kingdom